The Capistrano Formation is a geologic formation in coastal southern Orange County, California. It preserves fossils dating back to the late Miocene to early Pliocene, with the Oso Member representing a near-shore environment.  Fifty-nine species and varieties of foraminifera are recognized from the Capistrano Formation alongside a diverse array of marine mammals including up to five species of walrus.

Geography
The Capistrano Formation, named for the town of San Juan Capistrano, is located in southern California, specifically the northern extent of the Peninsular Ranges, which stretch from the Los Angeles Basin to Baja California.  It crops out along the coast from  Dana Point to San Clemente, and inland for seven miles.

Geology and Stratigraphy
The Capistrano Formation is a heterogenous marine formation that can be differentiated into two distinct but adjacent units. One of these units is the Oso Member, which is composed of arkosic sandstone and preserves a nearshore environment. This unit shows outcrops across Orange County, which are recognizable as medium to coarse grained, white to tan rock. The second member primarily consists of siltstone, preserves an environment that would have been located further out at sea in deeper waters and has not yet been named. At the southwestern border of the Oso Member the two units connect.

Depending on the locality, the Oso Member of the Capistrano Formation either conformably overlies the Puente Formation (specifically Soquel Member), while in other areas it unconformably overlies the Monterey Formation and is succeeded by the Niguel Formation. The Oso Member has been dated to the early late Hemphillian (6.6 to 5.8 Ma) based on the presence of Dinohippus  interpolatus and absence of older or younger taxa, but the formation as a whole extends into the Pliocene, rendering the Oso Member coeval with only the lower strata of the unnamed siltstone member. Foraminifers and microfossils have also previously been used to date the formation, which indicate an early Pliocene age (5.6 to 4.9 Ma) for its upper boundary.

Paleoenvironment
The two units of the Capistrano Formation preserve environments of difference distance from the shore. The Oso Member preserves a near-shore environment, thought to be submarine delta deposits situated in a shallow embayment of the Pacific Ocean. The presence of marlin fossils could indicate that parts of the formation deposited at bathyal depths, between 200 and 2.000 meters deep, and Fierstine argues that the preservation of the material suggests that it was not subject to extensive postmortem transportation. He also argues that the presence of this fish suggests warm water temperatures during the Miocene, with Marlins typically preferring average surface temperatures of 24 °C. Barboza and colleagues meanwhile argue that this alone is not sufficient evidence for depth, citing the preservation of marlin fossils in much shallower waters including one specimen found in deposits of the supralittoral zone. The proximity to the shore is apparent due to the presence of terrestrial fauna.

Paleofauna

Chondrichthyes

Osteichthyes

Reptilia

Aves

Mammalia

Afrotheria

Artiodactyla

Carnivora

Lagomorpha

Perissodactyla

See also

 List of fossiliferous stratigraphic units in California
 Paleontology in California

References

 

Neogene California
Geology of Orange County, California